Robin Krauße (born 2 April 1994) is a German footballer who plays as a midfielder for Eintracht Braunschweig.

Career statistics

References

External links
 

German footballers
1994 births
Living people
FC Hansa Rostock players
FC Carl Zeiss Jena players
FC Ingolstadt 04 players
SC Paderborn 07 players
Eintracht Braunschweig players
Association football midfielders
2. Bundesliga players
3. Liga players
Sportspeople from Jena